The Checkered Flag is a 1926 American silent drama film directed by John G. Adolfi and starring Elaine Hammerstein, Wallace MacDonald, and Lionel Belmore. The title refers to the automobile racing flag used to denote that the race is finished

Plot
As described in a film magazine review, Jack Reese, superintendent at Corbin Motors, is in love with Rita Corbin. His rival is managing director Ray Barton, who succeeds in having Jack fired. Jack and his pal Marcel Dejeans have invented a new carburetor, which they believe will work wonders in making a car win a race. The model carburetor is stolen but recovered by the chums. On the day of the big race, foul play prevents Jack and Marcel from appearing at the racetrack in time to compete. Rita shows her plunk by taking her lovers place and driving the car to victory. Jack becomes friends with Rita's father and wins her affection.

Cast
 Elaine Hammerstein as Rita Corbin 
 Wallace MacDonald as Jack Reese 
 Lionel Belmore as Joel Corbin 
 Robert Ober as Marcel Dejeans 
 Peggy O'Neil as Mary McQuire 
 Lee Shumway as Ray Barton 
 Flora Maynard as Elsie

References

Bibliography
 Munden, Kenneth White. The American Film Institute Catalog of Motion Pictures Produced in the United States, Part 1. University of California Press, 1997.

External links

1926 films
1926 drama films
American auto racing films
Silent American drama films
Films directed by John G. Adolfi
American silent feature films
1920s English-language films
1920s American films